Thibodaux is a city in, and the parish seat of, Lafourche Parish, Louisiana, United States, along the banks of Bayou Lafourche in the northwestern part of the parish. The population was 15,948 at the 2020 census. Thibodaux is a principal city of the Houma–Bayou Cane–Thibodaux metropolitan statistical area.

Thibodaux is nicknamed the "Queen City of Lafourche."

History 

The first documented Native American inhabitants of the Thibodaux area were the Chawasha, a small tribe related to the Chitimacha of the upper Bayou Lafourche. The first settlers of European descent in this area arrived in the 18th century, when Louisiana was the Spanish province of Luisiana. They consisted of French nationals and Louisiana-born French and German creoles, followed shortly by Spanish and French Acadian immigrants. The colonists gradually began to import Africans in bondage as slaves to work on and develop rice and sugar cane plantations.

The United States acquired Louisiana from France in 1803 as part of the Louisiana Purchase, after Napoleon, then First Consul, decided to sell France's North American possessions due to the failure to regain control of Saint-Domingue (which became the Republic of Haiti) and the impending threat of war with Great Britain. The present State of Louisiana became the U.S. Territory of Orleans, and in 1805 the Territorial Legislature created ten counties, among them the County of Lafourche (later Lafourche Parish). Americans from other states then began to settle in the area.

As early as 1808, a trading post and small village, known as "Thibodeauxville," had been established on the west bank of Bayou Lafourche, due to its strategic location near the confluence of Bayou Lafourche and Bayou Terrebonne. By the 1820s, the village had grown to a local center of the sugar cane industry. This settlement was formally incorporated as a town in 1830 under the name "Thibodauxville", in honor of local planter Henry Schuyler Thibodaux, the son of Acadian exiles. He had provided the land for the original village center and, as lieutenant governor, assumed the office of acting governor of the State of Louisiana in 1824. The area was developed in the antebellum period for sugar cane plantations, and Thibodaux was the trading center of the region. Sugar cane was an important commodity crop. The name of the town was shortened to "Thibodeaux" in 1838. The current spelling of the city's name, "Thibodaux," was apparently officially adopted in 1900. 

In January 1844, the prominent statesman and U.S. Senator Henry Clay, the "Great Compromiser," visited Thibodaux for several days as part of his campaign for the U.S. Presidency. A residential lane along the canal connecting Bayou Lafourche to Bayou Terrebonne was later named in his honor.

Confederate General Braxton Bragg, the victor at Chickamauga, and his wife had a plantation, "Bivouac," just north of Thibodaux and attended services at St. John's Episcopal Church on Jackson Street, founded by Bishop Leonidas Polk, the owner of "Leighton" plantation and later a Confederate lieutenant general killed in action.

In 1896, the first rural free delivery of mail in Louisiana began in Thibodaux. It was the second such RFD in the United States.

Civil War
In October 1862, following the Battle of Georgia Landing (Labadieville), Thibodaux was occupied by the Union Army under Brigadier General Godfrey Weitzel. Before the Confederates left the city, under the command of General Alfred Mouton , they burned the depot, the bridge, sugar, and supplies that they could not carry with them, in order to prevent Union forces from benefitting by them.

On June 20, 1863, Texas Confederate cavalry forces attacked the Union force occupying Thibodaux and captured the town. In a letter dated July 1, 1863, to his sister, Confederate Texas cavalryman Benjamin Franklin "Frank" Price proudly described the courage of his horse and a dramatic cavalry charge across the rebuilt Jackson Street bridge:

"I wish you could have seen Rowdy in the charge upon [Thibodaux]ville, I never saw a better cavalry horse, about three hundred of the best horses of the regiment was selected by Lt[.] Col[.] Crump to make the charge, and I can assure you that Rowdy stood the fire of the enemies [sic] guns as well or better than the rider. The cowardly Yankees could have killed all of us while we were crossing the bridge of [Thibodaux] but they only fired three rounds before they skedaddled and then such a yell; In one hour after we entered the town, the victory was ours . . ."

Winters reports that
terrified Negroes and whites raced into the town announcing that 3,000 Confederate cavalrymen were en route to attack Thibodaux and Lafourche Crossing. Union Colonel Thomas W. Cahill ordered an immediate retreat. The bayou bridges were burned, three field guns were destroyed, and as many of the men and the horses as possible were loaded . . . and ordered to Raceland. . . . Ammunition was destroyed, horses abandoned, and four field pieces were left behind.

Once the area was again under Union control, they ordered that enslaved people of African descent were to be freed and paid wages as free laborers. White planters in Thibodaux complained about having to negotiate labor contracts for the African-American workers. Alexander F. Pugh, a major sugar planter near Thibodaux, complained that
"I have agreed with the Negroes today to pay them monthly wages. It was very distasteful to me, but I could do no better. Everybody else in the neighborhood  has agreed to pay the same, and mine [laborers] would listen to nothing else."

Post-Reconstruction and Thibodaux massacre

In the late 19th century, after having taken back control of the state government following the Reconstruction era by use of election fraud and violence by paramilitary forces such as the White League, which suppressed black voting, white Democrats continued to consolidate their power over the state government. In the late 1880s they were challenged temporarily by a biracial coalition of Populists and Republicans. In this period, because blacks were skilled sugar workers, they briefly retained more rights and political power than did African Americans in the north of the state who worked as tenant farmers or sharecroppers on cotton plantations.

But from 1880, through the Louisiana Sugar Producers Association, some 200 major planters worked to regain slave conditions and control of workers, adopting uniform pay, withholding 80 percent of the workers' pay until after harvest, and making them accept scrip, redeemable only at plantation stores owned by the planters, rather than cash. Cane workers struck intermittently against these conditions.

The Knights of Labor organized a chapter in 1886 in Shreveport, Louisiana and attracted many cane workers seeking better conditions. A sugar cane workers' strike in Lafourche and three neighboring parishes involved 10,000 workers, 1,000 of whom were white, during the critical "rolling period" of the sugar cane harvest. Planters were alarmed both by outside labor organizations and the thought of losing their total crops. The governor called in the state militia at the planters' request; they protected strikebreakers and evicted black workers. The strike was broken in Terrebone Parish.

Paramilitary forces closed off Thibodaux, where numerous black workers had taken refuge. A New Orleans newspaper reported that "for three weeks past the negro women of the town have been making threats to the effect that if the white men resorted to arms they would burn the town and [end] the lives of the white women and children with their cane knives." Similarly, in the days leading up to the climactic event, it was reported that "[s]ome of the colored women made open threats against the people and the community, declaring that they would destroy any house in the town" and that "[n]ot a few of the negroes boasted that in case a fight was made they were fully prepared for it." One historian adds:

As late as November 21 some still comported themselves with confidence, and perhaps bravado, on the sidewalks. Mary Pugh, widow of Richard Pugh, owner of Live Oak Plantation in Lafourche Parish, reported "meeting negro men singly or two or three together with guns on their shoulders going down town & negro women on each side telling them to 'fight - yes - fight we'll be there.'"

On November 23, after the ambush and wounding of two pickets posted in the southern section of town, the militia committee began to indiscriminately shoot black workers and some family members, killing an estimated 35 (and quite possibly more) in what is called the "Thibodaux massacre" of November 23, 1887. The incident is generally considered to be the second bloodiest labor dispute in U.S. history. Casualties including wounded and missing were claimed by some to be in the hundreds, but there has never been an accurate count.

The cane workers returned to the plantations under conditions dictated by white planters. The massacre and subsequent disenfranchisement of blacks in Louisiana at the turn of the century by making voter registration more difficult, and white Democrats' imposition of Jim Crow, ended labor organizing of cane workers until the 1940s.

Geography

Climate

Demographics

As of the 2020 United States census, there were 15,948 people, 5,548 households, and 2,965 families residing in the city.

As of the census of 2000, there were 14,431 people, 5,500 households, and 3,355 families residing in the city. The racial makeup of the city was 64.04% White, 33.76% African American, 0.37% Native American, 0.64% Asian, 0.02% Pacific Islander, 0.26% from other races, and 0.90% from two or more races. Hispanic or Latino of any race were 1.03% of the population.

There were 5,500 households, out of which 29.7% had children under the age of 18 living with them, 38.1% were married couples living together, 19.4% had a female householder with no husband present, and 39.0% were non-families. 31.1% of all households were made up of individuals, and 11.5% had someone living alone who was 65 years of age or older. The average household size was 2.42 and the average family size was 3.10.

In the city, the population was spread out, with 24.6% under the age of 18, 17.3% from 18 to 24, 25.1% from 25 to 44, 18.9% from 45 to 64, and 14.1% who were 65 years of age or older. The median age was 31 years.  For every 100 females, there were 85.9 males. For every 100 females age 18 and over, there were 79.3 males.

The median income for a household in the city was $26,697, and the median income for a family was $36,551. Males had a median income of $31,464 versus $21,144 for females. The per capita income for the city was $16,966. About 20.6% of families and 25.1% of the population were below the poverty line, including 36.3% of those under age 18 and 18.2% of those age 65 or over.

Arts and culture

The Roman Catholic patron saints of Thibodaux are Saint Valérie, an early Christian martyr, and Saint Vitalis of Milan, her husband, also a martyr.  A life-sized reliquary of Saint Valérie, containing an arm bone, was brought to Thibodaux in 1868 and is displayed in her shrine in St. Joseph Co-Cathedral in Thibodaux.  A smaller reliquary, with a relic of St. Vitalis, is displayed near St. Valérie's reliquary.  St. Valérie has traditionally been invoked for intercession in protecting Thibodaux from hurricanes.

Richard D'Alton Williams, a well-known 19th-century Irish patriot, poet, and physician, died of tuberculosis in Thibodaux in 1862, and is buried in St. Joseph Cemetery. His headstone was erected that year by Irish members of the 8th New Hampshire Volunteer Infantry, then encamped in Thibodaux.  A famous Mississippi blues musician, Eddie "Guitar Slim" Jones, is buried in Thibodaux, where he often played, and where his manager, Hosea Hill, resided.  Two-term Governor of Louisiana Francis T. Nicholls is buried in the Episcopal Cemetery on Jackson Street.

Government
The mayor of Thibodaux is elected at-large and is currently Tommy Eschete. The city council of seven is elected from five single-member districts, and two at-large members. Thibodaux is in Parish Council Districts 1, 2, 3, and 4.

In the Louisiana Legislature, Thibodaux is currently represented by District 55 Rep. Bryan Fontenot (R-Thibodaux) and Sen. Bret Allain (R-Jeanerette). In the United States Congress, it is represented by Rep. Garret Graves (R-Baton Rouge), Sen. Bill Cassidy (R- Baton Rouge) and Sen. John Neely Kennedy (R-Madisonville).

The Louisiana Office of Juvenile Justice operates an office in Thibodaux.

The United States Postal Service operates the Thibodaux Post Office.

ZIP codes for Thibodaux are 70301, 70302, and 70310. Thibodaux's telephone area code is 985.

Education
Residents are zoned to schools in the Lafourche Parish Public Schools.

Zoned elementary schools include:
 C. M. Washington Elementary School
 Thibodaux Elementary School
 W.S. Lafargue Elementary School

Zoned middle schools include:
 East Thibodaux Middle School
 West Thibodaux Middle School
 Sixth Ward Middle School

Thibodaux residents are zoned to Thibodaux High School. From 1950 until 1968, C.M. Washington High School served as the segregated public school for African Americans in Thibodaux.

Catholic schools (of the Roman Catholic Diocese of Houma–Thibodaux) include:
 Edward Douglas White Catholic High School
 St. Genevieve Catholic Elementary
 St. Joseph Catholic Elementary

Colleges:
 Nicholls State University

Lafourche Parish is in the service area of Fletcher Technical Community College.

Media
The local newspaper is The Daily Comet. It was founded in 1889 as Lafourche Comet. It was owned by The New York Times Company from 1979 until 2011. The company sold this and other regional newspapers to Halifax Media Group.

Cable television and Internet are provided in Thibodaux by Reserve Telecommunications, AT&T, and Charter Spectrum.

In popular culture
The family and city name "Thibodaux" is mentioned in Hank Williams' "Jambalaya (On The Bayou)." In 1972 Leon Russell had the song "Cajun Love Song," in which Thibodaux is mentioned. It is also mentioned in the 1970s Jerry Reed song "Amos Moses," in the 1990s George Strait song "Adalida," in Dan Baird's 1992 song "Dixie Beauxderaunt," the 1999 Jimmy Buffett song "I Will Play for Gumbo," and the 2008 Toby Keith song "Creole Woman," and "Thibodaux" is the title of a song by jazz singer Marcia Ball.
The 1989 motion picture Fletch Lives was set in a fictionalized Thibodaux.
The video for Arcade Fire's 2022 single "The Lightning I, II" was shot in Thibodaux.

Notable people
 Eric Andolsek, professional football player for the Detroit Lions
 Charlton Beattie, U.S. federal judge; practiced law in Thibodaux
 Rezin Bowie, Louisiana politician and inventor of the Bowie knife; resided six years on Acadia Plantation near Thibodaux
 Braxton Bragg, Confederate general, slave-owner and planter on Bayou Lafourche in 1856-1861
 Adrian Joseph Caillouet, U.S. federal judge
 Kody Chamberlain, comic book writer and artist
 Thomas G. Clausen, professor at Nicholls State University from 1967 to 1972; last elected state superintendent of education, 1984-1988
 Mark Davis, professional basketball player
 Ronald Dominique, serial killer
 Alan Faneca, American football offensive lineman, nine-time Pro-Bowler, Super Bowl champion (XL)
 Jeremy Gaubert, winner of 2009 World Poker Open
 Mary Gauthier, folk singer-songwriter; grew up in Thibodaux
 Jarvis Green, defensive end for the Denver Broncos
 Walter Guion, U.S. senator from Louisiana
 Damian Johnson, player for the Minnesota Golden Gophers men's basketball team
 Clay Knobloch,  former Lieutenant Governor of Louisiana
 Louis La Garde, soldier, medical doctor and author
 Theodore K. Lawless, dermatologist, medical researcher, and philanthropist
 Oliver Marcelle, baseball player
 Graham Patrick Martin, actor TV: Major Crimes, The Closer, Two and a Half Men; Movies: The Anna Nicole Story, Bukowski, Somewhere Slow
 Whitmell P. Martin, congressman from Louisiana; moved to Thibodaux
 Jordan Mills, football player
 Numa F. Montet, congressman from Louisiana
 Doug Moreau, football player
 Drake Nevis, football player
 Francis T. Nicholls, Confederate brigadier general, two-term governor of Louisiana, and Louisiana Supreme Court justice; moved to Ridgefield Plantation near Thibodaux
 Harvey Peltier, Jr., state senator from 1964 to 1976; first president of the University of Louisiana System trustees from 1975 until his death in 1980
 Harvey Peltier, Sr., member of both houses of the Louisiana State Legislature from Thibodaux, 1924-1940
 Jerome "Dee" Richard, former member of the Louisiana House of Representatives from Thibodaux; one of two Independents in the legislature
 John Robichaux, jazz musician
 Greg Robinson, offensive lineman for the Detroit Lions
 Junius P. Rodriguez, academic and author
 Tom Roussel, football player
 Dustin Schuetter, actor, producer, director and screenwriter
 Billy Tauzin, congressman who lived in Thibodaux while he was in office<ref>Barone, Michael; and Ujifusa, Grant. The Almanac of American Politics 1988', p. 494. National Journal, 1987.</ref> 
 Theodore Ward, noted African-American playwright
 Edward Douglass White, Associate Justice and later Chief Justice of the United States Supreme Court
 Edward Douglass White Sr., governor of Louisiana
 Richard D'Alton Williams, Irish patriot, poet, and "Shamrock" of the Nation''.

See also
Warren J. Harang Jr. Municipal Auditorium

References

External links

City of Thibodaux
Thibodaux Chamber of Commerce website

 
Cities in Lafourche Parish, Louisiana
Cities in Louisiana
Parish seats in Louisiana
Cities in the Houma – Thibodaux metropolitan area